Devia may refer to:

Devia (plant), a genus of plants in the family Iridaceae
Devia (beetle), a genus of rove beetles in the family Staphylinidae
Mariella Devia, an Italian operatic soprano

See also:
De'VIA, a visual arts genre